Evgeny Eduardovich Baburin (alternate spelling: Evgenii) (born July 4, 1987) is a Russian professional basketball player for Nizhny Novgorod of the VTB United League. He also represents the senior Russian national basketball team.

Professional career
Baburin started his career with Nizhny Novgorod in the Russian 3rd Division. In 2008, he joined the Russian club TEMP-SUMZ Revda. In 2010, he moved to the Russian club Spartak Primorye Vladivostok. 

In 2012, he returned to Nizhny Novgorod. In 2016, he moved to the Russian club Lokomotiv Kuban Krasnodar.

Russian national team
Baburin has been a member of the senior Russia national basketball team. With Russia's senior national team, he played at the EuroBasket 2015, and at the EuroBasket 2017.

References

External links
Euroleague.net Profile
FIBA Profile (archive)
FIBA Europe Profile
Eurobasket.com Profile

1987 births
Living people
BC Nizhny Novgorod players
BC Spartak Primorye players
PBC Lokomotiv-Kuban players
Point guards
Russian men's basketball players
Shooting guards
Sportspeople from Nizhny Novgorod
2019 FIBA Basketball World Cup players